The Long Beach Dub Allstars are an American dub/ska/rock band formed in 1997 and disbanded in 2002, but reformed 10 years later.

History

Initial career (1997–2001)
Eric Wilson and Bud Gaugh met in childhood (in 1979) and later started their first garage punk band, consisting of drums, bass and vocals.  In 1988, with Bradley Nowell, they formed the ska punk and reggae rock band Sublime, which went on to sell over 17 million albums worldwide.  After Nowell's fatal heroin overdose in 1996, Wilson and Gaugh founded the Long Beach Dub Allstars (LBDAS), joined by frequent Sublime contributors Michael "Miguel" Happoldt, Todd Forman, and "Field" Marshall Goodman.

Eric Wilson said: "We will never replace the greatness that Sublime did or what Bradley has done." The LBDAS were originally a 10-piece and they recorded their debut recording called Right Back, which shortly after completion in 1999 saw the departure of three members. Their second album, Wonders of the World was recorded and released in 2001. It featured "Sunny Hours" featuring will.i.am from The Black Eyed Peas. "Sunny Hours" was also used as the theme song for the Friends spin-off Joey.

Breakup and aftermath (2002–2012)
In 2002, rumors that the band had broken up began to surface. Apparently the band had taken a hard-drug-free vow and some of the band's members had broken this vow, which caused Bud Gaugh to quit and join Eyes Adrift with Krist Novoselic of Nirvana and Curt Kirkwood of Meat Puppets. Gaugh subsequently played with Kirkwood and Michael Happoldt in the band Volcano. Eric Wilson, Trey Pangborn and RAS-1 formed Long Beach Shortbus with former Slightly Stoopid and temporary Sublime drummer, Kelly Vargas (later replaced by Damion Ramirez). Marshall Goodman, Jack Maness and Opie Ortiz formed Dubcat, with members of Hepcat. Shortbus has had slightly more success than Dubcat, though the latter has yet to release an album. Eric Wilson and Bud Gaugh have been reunited in Sublime with Rome, a new incarnation of Sublime which chiefly performs songs by that band and features Rome Ramirez in place of Bradley Nowell.

Reunion (2012–present)
On September 1, 2012, Long Beach Dub Allstars played their first show in 11 years at the Queen Mary Events Park next to the Queen Mary in Long Beach, California, where they opened for The Wailers and played alongside Tribal Seeds. Then on September 30, 2012, Long Beach Dub Allstars performed at the Yost Theater in Santa Ana, California, where they opened for Fishbone.
They played another show at the Brixton Southbay in Redondo Beach, California on January 25, 2013, with the local Redondo Beach Band Special "C". The reunion lineup consists of Marshall Goodman "Ras MG" on drums, Michael "Miguel" Happoldt on lead guitar/vocals, Opie Ortiz on vocals, Jack Maness on vocals/guitar/keys, Tim Wu on sax/flute/vocals, and Edwin Kampwith on bass.

When asked what kind of style the fans could look forward to hearing in possible new material, Jack Maness stated, "We’re doing some of the things that we’re true to and we’re also expanding into some other stuff."

According to Opie, they are currently doing some home recording but are looking to get into a studio: "Wherever we can get a good sound". Without giving too much away, the Long Beach legends hinted that guest appearances can be expected on future releases from artists they have worked with in the past, as well as new artists that they have plans on working with in the future.

In 2017, the group toured across California and played one-off shows in Nevada and Florida. They were set to play two shows in San Francisco and Sacramento early in 2018, as well as a gig at Red Rocks Amphitheatre on April 19.

On May 29, 2020, the Long Beach Dub Allstars released their eponymous third album under Suburban Noize Records.

Current group members
Opie Ortiz (vocals, album artwork)
Jack Maness (piano)
Edwin Kampwirth (bass)
Michael "Miguel" Happoldt (guitar, Sublime contributor)
Marshall Goodman "Ras MG" (drums, turntables, percussion, former Sublime member)
Tim Wu (alto saxophone, baritone saxophone, flute, vocals) now plays on and off with Reggae infused Rap-Rock group Chapter 11
Roger Rivas (organ)
Devin Morrison (guitar, vocals)

Group members
Opie Ortiz (vocals, album artwork)
Marshall Goodman "Ras MG" (drums, turntables, percussion, former Sublime member)
Roger Rivas (Keyboards)
Edwin Kampwirth (Bass)
Devin Morrison (Guitar)
Brad Croes (Sax)

Former members
Todd Forman (alto saxophone, percussion)
Isaiah Ikey Owens (Keyboard, The Mars Volta)
Eric Wilson (bass, Sublime and Sublime with Rome)
Bud Gaugh (drums, also Sublime and Sublime with Rome)
RAS-1 (Lead Vocals, guitar)
Jack Maness (keyboard, vocals)
Michael "Miguel" Happoldt (guitar, Sublime contributor)
Tim Wu (alto saxophone, baritone saxophone, flute, vocals) now plays on and off with Reggae infused Rap-Rock group Chapter 11

The group started out as a 10-piece, but Forman and Owens left while recording for the album Right Back. It is unclear whether or not they appear on the album. Miguel left shortly after it was recorded; he is shown on the album and is credited, but is not cited as a member.

Discography

Albums
Right Back (1999) No. 67 Billboard 200
Wonders of the World (2001) No. 59 Billboard 200
Long Beach Dub Allstars (2020)

Singles
"Trailer Ras" / "Kick Down" (1999)
"Sunny Hours" (2001) No. 28 Billboard Hot Modern Rock Tracks
"Holding On" / "Steady Customer" (2017)

Compilation appearances
Free the West Memphis 3 – "The Harder They Come" with Joe Strummer and Tippa Irie.

References

External links
MTV.com - The Long Beach Dub Allstars
Yahoo! LAUNCH - Long Beach Dub Allstars: Artist Page
MSN Entertainment page

  Ex-Sublime Drummer Arrested
Sublime Official Website

Culture of Long Beach, California
Punk rock groups from California
Sublime (band)
Musical groups established in 1997
Musical groups disestablished in 2002
Musical groups reestablished in 2012
Reggae rock groups